Ayatollah Sayyid Ali al-Husayni al-Milani (b. July 1948) is an Iraqi-Iranian Shia scholar. 

He is the founder of the Center for Islamic Facts in Qom. He is also the author of many books on the Islamic theology.

Family 
al-Milani was born to a prominent religious family, that emigrated from Medina, and settled in Milan, Iran in the 14th century. al-Milani's great ancestor was Ali al-Asghar, the son of the fourth Shia Imam, Ali Zayn al-Abideen.

Lineage

Early life and education 
al-Milani was born in Najaf in 1948. His father was Sayyid Nur al-Din al-Milani, an alem who used to occasionally lead the prayers at the Imam Husayn shrine. His grandfather was Grand Ayatollah Sayyid Mohammad Hadi Milani, a leading Shia scholar in Iraq and Iran.

al-Milani studied in the Islamic seminary of Karbala, and Najaf. He studied under scholars like Sayyid Zain Al-Abidin al-Kashani, Sayyid Hassan al-Tabatabaei al-Qomi, Sheikh Muhammad Ali al-Ardebili, Sheikh Ali Muhammad al-Boroujerdi, Sayyid Nur al-Din Al-Milani, and Sayyid Abu Al-Qasim al-Khoei.

Travel to Iran 
He went to Iran on the orders of his grandfather, and he attended his research in Mashhad. He remained with his grandfather until he died in 1975. al-Milani then relocated to the city of Qom. He studied in Islamic jurisprudence and Principles of Islamic jurisprudence under scholars like Sayyid Mohammad-Reza Golpaygani, Sheikh Hossein Wahid Khorasani, Sheikh Kazem Tabrizi, Sheikh Murtadha al-Ha'eri, and Grand Ayatollah Sayyid Muhammad Rohani.

Works 
 The Promised Savior: An Inquiry Into The Imamate of Imam Mahdi (as) From The Viewpoint of Muslim Thinkers
 A Critical Assessment of Sahih Bukhari and Sahih Muslim
 A Critical Assessment of Umm Kulthum's Marriage to Umar
 A Distortion in Thaqalain Tradition
 Fabricated Traditions
 Ghadir as Narrated by Ahlul Bayt (a.s.)
 The Truth about the 'Companions'
 Prohibition of Two Lawful Pleasures: A Critical Assessment of Prohibition of Mut'a of Hajj and Mut'a Marriage

References

External links 
 https://www.al-islam.org/person/sayyid-ali-al-husayni-al-milani
 Sayyid Ali al-Husayni al-Milani books in Arabic

1948 births
Shia scholars of Islam
Twelvers
Al-Husayni family
People from Najaf
Iraqi people of Iranian descent
Iraqi Shia clerics
Living people
People deported from Iraq